This is a list of electoral results for the electoral district of Heidelberg in Victorian state elections.

Members for Heidelberg

Election results

Elections in the 1940s

Elections in the 1930s

Elections in the 1920s

References

Victoria (Australia) state electoral results by district